Andrei Uladzimirovich Stsepanchuk (born 12 June 1979 in Minsk) is a male race walker from Belarus.

Achievements

References

1979 births
Living people
Belarusian male racewalkers
Athletes (track and field) at the 2004 Summer Olympics
Athletes (track and field) at the 2008 Summer Olympics
Olympic athletes of Belarus
Athletes from Minsk